Orobanche corymbosa is a species of broomrape known by the common name flat-top broomrape. It is native to western North America where it is a parasite growing attached to the roots of other plants, usually sagebrush (Artemisia tridentata). As a parasite taking its nutrients from a host plant, it lacks leaves and chlorophyll. The inflorescence is a wide array of a few tubular flowers.

References

External links

Photo gallery

corymbosa
Flora of the Western United States
Flora of British Columbia
Flora of California
Flora of the Cascade Range
Flora of the Rocky Mountains
Least concern flora of the United States